PCBM is the common abbreviation for the fullerene derivative [6,6]-phenyl-C61-butyric acid methyl ester.  It is being investigated in organic solar cells.

PCBM is a fullerene derivative of the C60 buckyball that was first synthesized in the 1990s. It is an electron acceptor material and is often used in organic solar cells (plastic solar cells) or flexible electronics in conjunction with electron donor materials such as P3HT or other conductive polymers.  It is a more practical choice for an electron acceptor when compared with fullerenes because of its solubility in chlorobenzene. This allows for solution processable donor/acceptor mixes, a necessary property for "printable" solar cells.  However, considering the cost of fabricating fullerenes, it is not certain that this derivative can be synthesized on a large scale for commercial applications.

See also
Organic solar cell

References

Carboxylate esters
Fullerenes
Phenyl compounds